In mathematics, by sigma function one can mean one of the following:

 The sum-of-divisors function σa(n), an arithmetic function
 Weierstrass sigma function, related to elliptic functions
 Rado's sigma function, see busy beaver

See also sigmoid function.